The episodes of the American television series Scarecrow and Mrs. King premiered on CBS October 3, 1983 where it ran for four seasons and 88 episodes until its conclusion on May 28, 1987. The series follows the working relationship and eventual romance between housewife Amanda King (Kate Jackson) and top secret agent Lee Stetson (Bruce Boxleitner), codenamed "Scarecrow".

Series overview

Episodes

Season 1 (1983–84)

Season 2 (1984–85)

Season 3 (1985–86)

Season 4 (1986–87)

References

External links
 

Lists of American action television series episodes
Lists of American crime television series episodes
Lists of American espionage television series episodes